North Dakota Highway 68 (ND 68) is a  east–west state highway in the U.S. state of North Dakota. ND 68's western terminus is a continuation as Montana Highway 23 (MT 23) at the Montana border, and the eastern terminus is at U.S. Route 85 (US 85) south of Alexander.

Major intersections

References

068
Transportation in McKenzie County, North Dakota